Napoli Centrale is an Italian jazz-rock group, founded in Naples in 1975.

History 
The musical project was founded by musicians James Senese and Franco Del Prete, who following the disbandment of their previous R&B band    (later known as Showmen 2) wanted to pursue a different musical path. The style of the band is characterized by a mixture between rock, folk, jazz and blues, with lyrics in Neapolitan language which often deal with social themes. The group got an immediate commercial and critical success with its first eponymous album  and its first single "Campagna", representing a significant exception to the other successful Italian bands of the time, either dedicated to progressive rock or characterized by a melodic and romantic repertoire.

Shortly later the release of their first album, bassist Tony Walmsley and keyboardist Mark Harris left the band to join Il Rovescio della Medaglia, and it started a period of numerous lineup changes, which also briefly saw Pino Daniele as bassist. In the early 1980s Senese pursued a solo career, putting the band on hyatus. Senese reconstituted the band in the early 1990s, with Savio Riccardi, Gigi De Rienzo and Agostino Marangolo. In 1992 they released their comeback album Jesceallah, in which Art Ensemble of Chicago members  Lester Bowie and Don Moye collaborated.

Personell

Discography 
Album    
 
 1975 – Napoli Centrale (Dischi Ricordi, SMRL 6159)
     1976 – Mattanza (Dischi Ricordi, SMRL 6187)
     1977 – Qualcosa ca nu’ mmore (Dischi Ricordi, SMRL 6224) 
     1992 – Jesceallah (Blue Angel, BAR 40592)[3]
     1994 – ’Ngazzate nire (Blue Angel, FDM 70494)[3]
     2001 – Zitte! Sta venenn’ ’o mammone (Sony, PDG 5030512) 
     2016 – 'O sanghe (Ala Bianca/Warner Music, RNR 128554132-2)
     2018 – Aspettanno ‘o tiempo (River Nile Records, RNR 128554197–1)

References

External links
 
 

Musical groups established in 1975
1975 establishments in Italy
Italian folk music groups
Italian rock music groups